The Holden Commodore is a full-size car that was sold by Holden from 1978 to 2020. It was manufactured from 1978 to 2017 in Australia and from 1979 to 1990 in New Zealand, with production of the locally manufactured versions in Australia ending on 20 October 2017. 

Between 2018 and 2020, a rebadged Opel Insignia, built in Germany, was sold in Australia as the Holden Commodore (ZB). All sales of new Commodores ended in 2020, coinciding with the discontinuation of the Holden marque and nameplate entirely.

From 1978, the Commodore replaced the long-serving Holden Kingswood and Holden Premier: mid-sized executive cars developed in Australia. Initially, the Commodore was based on the Opel Commodore (C), a smaller, contemporary rear wheel drive (RWD) platform designed by General Motors' German subsidiary. This was redesigned by Holden, to suit the demands of the Australian market, road conditions and manufacturing. Subsequent series of Holden Commodore became larger, and were also influenced by the Opel Senator and Opel Omega. The fourth generation Commodore, fully developed and manufactured in Australia, was based on the Holden developed Zeta platform.

Initially introduced as a single sedan body style, the range expanded in 1979 to include a station wagon. From 1984, Holden began branding the flagship model as Holden Calais, with the Commodore Berlina introduced in 1984 gaining independent Holden Berlina nomenclature in 1988. Long-wheelbase Statesman/Caprice derivatives and Commodore utility body variants followed in 1990. The third generation architecture spawned the most body styles, with a new Holden utility launched in 2000 (now officially as the Holden Ute), reborn Monaro coupé in 2001, four-door Holden Crewman utility and all-wheel drive (AWD) Holden Adventra crossover in 2003. Holden Special Vehicles (HSV) in 1987 began official modification of high performance variants of the Commodore and its derivatives, under its own nameplate.

Rivalry came predominantly from the Ford Falcon—also locally built. Prior to the second generation Commodore of 1988, the Holden was positioned a full class below the full-size Falcon. To varying degrees, competition also came from mid-size offerings from Toyota Australia as well as Chrysler Australia, which morphed into Mitsubishi Motors Australia. Moreover, between 1989 and 1997, Australian federal government policy saw the launch of the Toyota Lexcen, which was a rebadged version of the second generation Commodore. With the introduction of the third generation in 1997, Holden implemented its largest export programs involving Commodore and its derivatives. In the Middle East, South Africa and Brazil, the Commodore sold as a Chevrolet. High-performance export versions followed in North America, sold as Pontiac and later Chevrolet. HSV also exported to the United Kingdom as Vauxhall, in the Middle East as Chevrolet Special Vehicles (CSV) and in New Zealand and Singapore as HSV.

In December 2013, Holden announced that it would cease its local production by the end of October 2017 committing, however, to use the long-standing Commodore nameplate on its fifth-generation fully imported replacement, moving to a front-wheel drive (FWD)/all-wheel drive (AWD) platform.

On 10 December 2019, Holden announced that the Commodore nameplate would be discontinued in 2020, in what is, according to Holden's interim chairman and managing director Kristian Aquilina, "decisive action to ensure a sharp focus on the largest and most buoyant market segments", focusing on their SUV and Ute range, which had accounted for over 76% of their lineup during 2019. This marks the end of the Commodore nameplates' 41 years." On 17 February 2020, General Motors announced that the Holden marque in its entirety would be retired from sale in Australia and New Zealand by 2021.

First generation (1978–1988)

VB (1978–1980) 

Introduced in October 1978, the VB Commodore development covered a period with the effects of the 1973 oil crisis still being felt. Hence, when Holden decided to replace the successful full-size HZ Kingswood with a new model line, they wanted the new car to be smaller and more fuel efficient. Originally, Holden looked at developing a new WA Kingswood, but that project was abandoned. With no replacement in development, Holden looked to Opel to provide the foundations of the VB, basing it loosely on the four-cylinder Rekord E bodyshell, with the front grafted on from the Opel Senator A, both constructed using GM's V-body platform. This change was necessitated to accommodate the larger Holden six- and eight-cylinder engines. Holden also adopted the name "Commodore" from Opel, which had been using the name since 1967. Opel went on to use Holden's Rekord-Senator hybrid as a foundation for its new generation Commodore C, slotting in between the two donor models.

The VB series retained 96 percent of the preceding HZ Kingswood's interior space, despite being 14 percent smaller in overall dimensions, although five percent larger than the Torana. With the Commodore dropping a full class below the Kingswood and its Ford Falcon competitor, the smaller Commodore was predictably more fuel-efficient. This downsizing was first seen as a major disadvantage for Holden, as they had effectively relinquished the potential of selling Commodores to the fleet and taxi industries. These sales losses were thought to be unrecoverable; however, the 1979 energy crisis saw Australian oil prices rise by 140 percent, putting substantial strain on the automotive industry to collectively downsize, a change that Holden had already done.

During the VB's development, Holden realised that when driven at speed over harsh Australian roads, the Rekord would effectively break in half at the firewall. This forced Holden to rework the entire car for local conditions, resulting in only 35 percent commonality with the Opel. The Rekord's MacPherson strut front suspension was accordingly modified, and the recirculating ball steering was replaced with a rack and pinion type. These modifications blew development costs beyond expectations to a reported —a figure close to the cost of developing a new model independently. With such a large sum consumed by the VB development programme, Holden was left with insufficient finances to resource the development of a wagon variant. Added that the Commodore architecture was considered an unsuitable base for utility and long-wheelbase models, Holden was left with only a sedan, albeit one in three levels of luxury: a base, SL, and SL/E. Desperate measures forced Holden to shape the Commodore front-end to the rear of the Rekord wagon. As the wagon-specific sheet metal had to be imported from Germany, the wagon, introduced in July 1979, suffered from inevitable component differences from the sedan. Although infrequently criticised in the early years, quality problems were evident, with poor trim and panel fit problematic for all first generation Commodores. This coupled with mechanical dilemmas such as water pump failure and steering rack rattle ensured warranty claims were high in the first year. Despite these issues, VB was praised for its value for money and sophistication, especially in regards to the steering, ride quality, handling and brakes, thus securing the Wheels Car of the Year award for 1978.

VC (1980–1981) 

The most significant change to the VC Commodore of March 1980 was the engine upgrading to "XT5" specification. Now painted blue and thus known as the Blue straight-sixes and Holden V8s, these replaced the Red units fitted to the VB and earlier cars. Changes included a new twelve-port cylinder head, redesigned combustion chambers, inlet and exhaust manifolds, a new two-barrel carburettor . Tweaks and changes to the V8s surrounded the implementation of electronic ignition, revised cylinder head and inlet manifold design and the fitment of a four-barrel carburettor on the 4.2-litre variant. These changes brought improved efficiency, increased outputs and aided driveability. In response to increasing oil prices, a four-cylinder variant was spawned in June 1980. Displacing 1.9-litres, this powerplant known as Starfire was effectively Holden's existing straight-six with two cylinders removed. Reports indicate that the need to push the engine hard to extract performance led to real-world fuel consumption similar to the straight-sixes.

Holden's emphasis on fuel economy extended beyond powertrains, with a fuel consumption vacuum gauge replacing the tachometer throughout the range, although this could be optioned back with the sports instrumentation package. Visual changes were limited: the relocation of the corporate crest to the centre of the redesigned grille, black-coloured trim applied to the tail lamp surrounds on sedans, and the embossment of model badging into the side rubbing strips. The previously undesignated base car, was now the Commodore L, opening up the range for a new unbadged sub-level car. This delete option model, was de-specified and available only to fleet customers. On the premium Commodore SL/E, a resurrected "Shadowtone" exterior paint option became available in a limited range of dark-over-light colour combinations. According to contemporary reviews, changes made to the VC's steering produced a heavier feel and inclined understeer, while the revised suspension gave a softer ride and addressed concerns raised while riding fully laden.

VH (1981–1984) 

The VH series Commodore introduced in September 1981 brought moderately updated frontal bodywork, with a new bonnet and front guards to facilitate the reshaped headlamps and a horizontally slatted grille. These front-end design changes worked to produce a longer, yet wider look. At the rear, sedans featured redesigned tail light clusters, the design of which borrowed from Mercedes-Benz models of the day, using a louvered design. At the same time, the nomenclature of the range was rationalised. The SL superseded the L as the base model, with the old SL level becoming the mid-range SL/X, and the SL/E remaining as the top-of-the-line variant. Wagons were restricted to the SL and SL/X trims. Redesigned pentagonal alloy wheels—replacing the original SL/E type used since 1978—along with a black painted B-pillar, wrap-around chrome rear bumper extensions to the wheel arches, and extended tail lamps that converged with the license plate alcove—distinguished the range-topping SL/E from other variants. The new pentagonal wheels were initially in short supply, such that only Shadowtone option SL/E sedans received them during 1981 production.

Mechanical specifications carried over, except for a new five-speed manual transmission, optional on the 1.9-litre four-cylinder and 2.85-litre six-cylinder versions. In an attempt to improve sales figures of the inline-four engine, Holden spent considerable time improving its performance and efficiency. Modifications were also made to the 2.85-litre six to lift economy, and the powerplants managed to reduce fuel consumption by as much as 12.5 and 14 percent, correspondingly. Holden released the sports-oriented Commodore SS sedan in September 1982—reintroducing a nameplate used briefly ten years prior with the HQ series. Provisioned with a choice of 4.2- or optional 5.0-litre V8 engines, both versions of the VH SS were teamed with a four-speed manual transmission. Racing driver Peter Brock's Holden Dealer Team (HDT) high performance outfit produced three upgraded versions, known as Group One, Group Two and Group Three, the latter version available in either 4.2-litre or more commonly 5.0-litre V8 configuration.

By the time of the VH series, Commodore sales were beginning to decline. Holden's six-cylinder engine, which was carried over from the Kingswood, could trace its roots back to 1963 and was no longer competitive. Continual improvements made to Commodore's Ford Falcon rival meant the VH was not significantly more fuel-efficient or better performing despite the smaller size. This was curtailed by the absence of any major powertrain revisions by the time of the VH and the lack of visual departure from the original VB. Holden also had to deal with the influx of their own mid-size Camira from 1982, which presented comparable interior volume with lower fuel consumption, and for less than the Commodore pricing point. Camira sales were strong initially, but as fuel prices had stabilised, buyers gravitated away from Camira and Commodore towards the larger Falcon, which overtook the Commodore as Australia's bestselling car for the first time in 1982.

VK (1984–1986) 

Representing the first major change since the VB original, the VK model of 1984 introduced a six-window glasshouse, as opposed to the previous four-window design, to make the Commodore appear larger. The revised design helped stimulate sales, which totalled 135,000 in two years. This did not put an end to Holden's monetary woes. Sales of the initially popular Camira slumped due to unforeseen quality issues, while the Holden WB series commercial vehicle range and the Statesman WB luxury models were starting to show their age; their 1971 origins compared unfavourably with Ford's more modern Falcon and Fairlane models.

New names for the trim levels were also introduced, such as Commodore Executive (an SL with air conditioning and automatic transmission), Commodore Berlina (replacing SL/X) and Calais (replacing SL/E). The 5.0-litre V8 engine continued to power high specification variants, but was shrunk from 5,044 cc to 4,987 cc in 1985 due to new Group A racing homologation rules. As high oil prices became a thing of the past, Holden decided to drop the 2.85- six and 4.2-litre V8, while the 1.9-litre four-cylinder was limited to New Zealand.

VL (1986–1988) 

Marking a high point in terms of sales, the last-of-the-series VL Commodore sold in record numbers, finally managing to outsell the Ford Falcon in the private sector. The 1986 VL represented a substantial makeover of the VK and would be the last of the mid-size Commodores for 30 years. Designers distanced the Commodore further away from its Opel origins, by smoothing the lines of the outer body and incorporating a subtle tail spoiler. A thorough redesign of the nose saw the Commodore gain sleek, narrow headlamps and a shallower grille, while the Calais specification employed unique partially concealed headlamps.

By this stage, Holden's 24‑year‑old six-cylinder was thoroughly outmoded and would have been difficult to re-engineer to comply with pending emission standards and the introduction of unleaded fuel. This led Holden to sign a deal with Nissan of Japan to import their RB30E engine. This seemed a good idea in 1983 when the Australian dollar was strong; however by 1986 the once viable prospect became rather expensive. The public quickly accepted what was at first a controversial move, as reports emerged of the improvements in refinement, 33 percent gain in power and 15 percent better economy over the carburettor version of the VK's Black straight-six. In October 1986, an unleaded edition of Holden's carburettored V8 engine was publicised. Holden had originally planned to discontinue the V8 to spare the engineering expense of converting to unleaded. However, public outcry persuaded them to relent. VLs in New Zealand, Indonesia, Singapore and Thailand were also available with the 2.0-litre six-cylinder RB20E engine.

The VL suffered from some common build quality problems, such as poor windshield sealing, that can lead to water leakages and corrosion. Awkward packaging under the low bonnet coupled with Holden's decision to utilise a cross-flow radiator (as opposed to the up-down flow radiator installed to the equivalent Nissan Skyline) meant the six-cylinder engine was especially susceptible to cracked cylinder heads, a problem not displayed on the Nissan Skyline with which it shares the RB30E engine. The Used Car Safety Ratings, published in 2008 by the Monash University Accident Research Centre, found that first generation Commodores (VB–VL), similarly to the Ford Falcons manufactured during the same years, provide a "worse than average" level of occupant safety protection in the event of an accident.<ref name = "Used Car Safety Ratings"  It is perhaps noteworthy however, that the Monash University publication includes in its averages, vehicles manufactured as late as 2006. <ref name = "Used Car Safety Ratings" As such, and with reasonable necessity, the 2008 Used Car Safety Ratings include comparison of some non-airbag vehicles with later vehicles fitted with airbags.  In 1988, it would still be some years before airbags became available to the public on vehicles manufactured in Australia, and, outside of the very high end luxury market, available in Australia at all.  As airbag technology later become more available, the Holden Commodore would become one of the first to offer the option (see VR Commodore below).

Second generation (1988–1997)

VN (1988–1991) 

The VN Commodore of 1988 and subsequent second generation models took their bodywork from the larger Opel Senator B and new Opel Omega A. However, this time, the floor plan was widened and stretched; now matching the rival Ford Falcon for size. Continuing financial woes at Holden meant the wider VN body was underpinned by narrow, carry-over VL chassis components in a bid to save development costs. In Australia, for the VN and succeeding models, the Commodore Berlina became known simply as the Berlina (but in New Zealand the V6 VN Berlina, assembled locally until the Trentham factory was closed in 1990, was badged Executive. The Berlina nameplate was not launched, as a new entry level grade, with trim and equipment equivalent to the Australian V6 Executive, until the locally built four cylinder model, using the Australian-made, Opel designed, two-litre Family Two fuel injected engine, was added some months after the V6s). The range expanded in 1990 to include a utility variant, given the model designation VG. This was built on a longer-wheelbase platform that it shared with the station wagon and luxury VQ Statesman sedans released earlier in the year. During this time, the rival Ford EA Falcon was plagued with initial quality issues which tarnished its reputation. The team at Wheels magazine awarded the VN Car of the Year in 1988: the second Commodore model to receive this award.

Changes in the relative values of the Australian dollar and Japanese yen made it financially impractical to continue with the well-regarded Nissan engine of the VL. Instead, Holden manufactured their own 3.8-litre V6 engine based on a Buick design, adapted from FWD to RWD. The 5.0-litre V8 remained optional and received a power boost to  courtesy of multi-point fuel injection. Although not known for its refinement, the new V6 was nevertheless praised for its performance and fuel efficiency at the time. The 2.0-litre Family II engine offered in New Zealand was also offered in some other export markets including Singapore  where the model also was badged Berlina. Accompanying the changes to engines, the VL's four-speed automatic transmission was replaced by the Turbo-Hydramatic and a Borg-Warner five-speed manual. A Series II update of the VN appeared in September 1989, featuring a revised V6 engine known internally as the EV6.

Under an unsuccessful model sharing arrangement that was part of the Hawke Labor government reforms in 1989, which saw the formation of the United Australian Automobile Industries alliance between Holden and Toyota Australia, the latter began selling badge engineered versions of the VN Commodore manufactured by Holden. The rebadged Commodores were sold as the Toyota Lexcen, named after Ben Lexcen, who was the designer of the Australia II yacht that won the 1983 America's Cup. The original T1 Lexcen offered sedan and station wagon body forms in three levels of trim: base, GL and GLX. Moreover, they were only available with a 3.8-litre V6 engine and automatic transmission combination.

VP (1991–1993) 

The VP update of 1991 featured cosmetic and mechanical changes, while carrying over the 3.8-litre V6 and 5.0-litre V8 engines from the VN. The 2.0-litre straight-four engine previously available in New Zealand was discontinued. Exterior cosmetic changes included a translucent acrylic grille on the base level Executive and Berlina, with a colour-coded grille for the S and SS, and a chrome grille for Calais. Updated tail lights and boot garnishes were also a part of the changes, which were different for each model, with the Berlina having grey stripes and the Calais chrome stripes. semi-trailing arm independent rear suspension became standard on the Calais and SS, but was made an option on lower-end models in lieu of the live rear axle, improving ride and handling.

A new wider front track was introduced to address issues with the previous carried-over VL chassis components. In August 1992, anti-lock brakes were introduced as an option on the Calais and SS trim levels, later becoming optional on all Series II variants. This January 1993 update also included a colour-coded grille for the Executive and alloy wheels for the Commodore S.

Toyota's pattern of updating their Lexcen model tended to follow Commodore's model cycle. The T2 (VP) Lexcen from 1991 pioneered new specification designations: CSi, VXi and Newport. All future updates (T3 (VR), T4 (VS) and T5 (VS II) Lexcens) made use of the new naming system until 1997, when the badge engineering scheme ceased. To give further differentiation to the Lexcen from the Commodore, the Lexcens from the VP model onwards had unique front-end styling treatments.

VR (1993–1995) 

The 1993 VR Commodore represented a major facelift of the second generation architecture leaving only the doors and roof untouched. Approximately 80 percent of car was new in comparison to the preceding model. Exterior changes brought an overall smoother body, semicircular wheel arches and the "twin-kidney" grille—a Commodore styling trait which remained until the VY model of 2002 and remains a permanent staple on the HSV variants to this day.

The rear-end treatment saw raised tail lights, implemented for safety reasons, and a driver's side airbag was introduced as an option: a first for an Australian-built car. Other safety features such as anti-lock brakes and independent rear suspension were only available with the new electronic GM 4L60-E automatic transmission. Along with a driver's airbag and cruise control, these features were packaged into a new Acclaim specification level: a family-oriented safety spec above the entry-level Executive. Holden's strong focus on safety can be seen in the Used Car Safety Ratings. The findings show that in an accident, VN/VP Commodores provide a "worse than average" level of occupant protection. However, the updated VR/VS models were found to provide a "better than average" level of safety protection. Holden issued a Series II revision in September 1994 bringing audible warning chimes for the handbrake and fuel level among other changes.

The latest revision of the Buick 3.8-litre V6 engine was fitted to the VR Commodore, featuring rolling-element bearings in the valve rocker arms and increased compression ratios. Wheels magazine awarded the VR Commodore Car of the Year in 1993.

VS (1995–1997) 

The 1995 VS Commodore served as a mechanical update of the VR, destined to maintain sales momentum before the arrival of an all-new VT model. The extent of exterior changes amounted to little more than a redesigned Holden logo and wheel trims. An overhauled Ecotec (Emissions and Consumption Optimisation through TEChnology) version of the Buick V6 engine coincided with changes to the engine in the United States. Holden mated the new engine with a modified version of the GM 4L60-E automatic transmission, improving throttle response and smoothing gear changes. The Series II update of June 1996 included elliptical side turn signals, interior tweaks and the introduction of a supercharged V6 engine for selected trim levels, and the introduction of a new Getrag manual transmission.

The VS Commodore was the last to be sold as a Toyota Lexcen, as Holden and Toyota ended their model-sharing scheme. The last Lexcens were built during 1997. This model was also sold as the VS Commodore Royale in New Zealand. Similar in specification to the Calais also sold in New Zealand, the Royale featured a standard VS Commodore body with the front end from the VS Caprice and an Opel 2.6-litre 54-Degree V6 engine. The Royale was also sold between 1995 and 1997 in small numbers to Malaysia and Singapore as the Opel Calais.

Third generation (1997–2007)

VT (1997–2000) 

With the VT Commodore of 1997, Holden looked again to Opel in Germany for a donor platform. The proposal was to take the Opel Omega B and broaden the vehicle's width and mechanical setup for local conditions. In the early days, Holden considered adopting the Omega as is, save for the engines and transmissions, and even investigated reskinning the existing VR/VS architecture. Later on, the VT bodywork spawned a new generation of Statesman and Caprice (again based on the long-wheelbase wagons), and even went as far as resurrecting the iconic Monaro coupé of the 1960s and 1970s via a prototype presented at the 1998 Sydney Motor Show.

The VT heralded the fitment of semi-trailing arm independent rear suspension as standard across the range, a significant selling point over the rival Falcon, along with increased electronics such as Traction Control. However, in terms of suspension, the original Opel design was simplified by removing the toe control links that was standard equipment on the European Omega since 1987. Consequently, this afflicted the VT with excessive tyre wear due to distortions to the suspension camber angle and toe under heavy load, such as heavy towing or when travelling over undulated surfaces.

Notably, Holden's performance arm HSV re-added the toe control link on the flagship GTS 300 model. The 1999 Series II update replaced the venerable Holden 5.0-litre V8 engine with a new 5.7-litre Generation III V8 sourced from the United States. Safety wise, side airbags became an option for the Acclaim and higher models, a first for Holden.

From the onset, parent company General Motors was interested in incorporating a left-hand drive Commodore in its Buick lineup, as manifested by the unveiling of the Buick XP2000 concept car in 1996. Although this idea was ultimately abandoned (due to pressures by the North American automotive trade unions to retain local production), the GM-funded project allowed Holden to enter into a range of left-hand export markets. Thus began the Commodore's rapid expansion into parts of Indochina, the Middle East and South Africa badged as the Chevrolet Lumina and Brazil as the Chevrolet Omega 3.8 V6. In its home market, the VT series was awarded the 1997 Wheels Car of the Year award, the fourth such award in Commodore's history. It found ready acceptance in the market as many buyers steered away from the slow selling Ford AU Falcon, becoming the best selling Commodore to date and cementing its place as number one in Australian sales.

The sedan and wagon range comprised: Commodore Executive (base and fleet package); Commodore Acclaim (family and safety package); Berlina (luxury package) and Calais (sedan-only sport luxury package). Limited editions included a "Sydney 2000" Olympic version and Holden 50th Anniversary based on better equipped Executive models (e.g. Berlina alloy wheels on the former but no climate control).

VX (2000–2002) 

The VX update from 2000 featured a revised headlamp design. The VT's rear tail lamp panel was replaced by two separate light assemblies. Conversely, the luxury-oriented Berlina and Calais sedans continued using a full-width boot-lid panel incorporating the registration plate and tail lamps.

The VX series also formed the basis for a new Holden Ute, designated the VU-series. Earlier utility models were instead entitled "Commodore utility". An updated Series II was launched in early 2002, featuring revised rear suspension system now equipped with toe control links to address the VT's issues. The VX series also spawned the production version of the re-launched Holden Monaro (allowing Holden to commence exports to the United States, with this coupé sold as the Pontiac GTO).

Safety played a substantial role in the development of the VX model. Bosch 5.3 anti-lock brakes were made standard on all variants, a first for an Australian manufactured car; and traction control was made available on vehicles equipped with manual transmission. Extensive research was undertaken to reduce the effects from a side-impact collision through modification of the B-pillars. The risk presented by a side-impact collision in a VX fitted without side airbags is reduced by 50 percent when compared to a similarly specified VT model.

VY (2002–2004) 

The  VY mid-cycle update of 2002 represented the first major styling shift since the 1997 VT. Designers discarded the rounded front and rear styling of the VT and VX models, adopting more aggressive, angular lines. The same approach was applied to the interior, whereby the curvaceous dashboard design was orphaned in favour of an angular, symmetrical design. Satin chrome plastic now dominated the façade of the centre console stack, and high-end models received fold-out cup holders borrowed from fellow GM subsidiary Saab. Leaving Eurovox behind, Holden turned towards German electronics manufacturer Blaupunkt to source audio systems, an arrangement that remained in place until the end of the Holden brand.

Engineering wise, Holden kept the changes low key. A revised steering system and tweaked suspension tuning were among some of the changes to sharpen handling precision. In a bid to recapture the market for low-cost, high-performance cars, Holden created a new SV8 specification level. Based on the entry-level Executive, the SV8 inherited the V8 mechanical package from the SS but made do without the luxury appointments and was sold at a correspondingly lower price. Holden also experimented by releasing a limited edition wagon version of its high-performance SS variant, of which only 850 were built. The Series II update added a front strut bar as standard to the SS, which was claimed to increase rigidity and hence handling. As became the trend, the update raised V8 power, now up . Amendments in the remaining models were confined to new wheels, trims and decals, however, the Calais has taken on a sports-luxury persona as opposed to the discrete luxury character seen in previous models. This repositioning in turn affected the Berlina's standing. The once second-tier model now became the sole luxury model, only overshadowed by the more expensive Calais. Coinciding with the VY II models was the first four-door utility model dubbed the Holden Crewman. Crewman's underpinnings and body structure while somewhat unusual, shared a fair amount in common with the Statesman/Caprice, One tonner and the two-door Ute.

Unveiled after the Series II updates, the first application of this electronically controlled system was the Holden Adventra, a raised VY wagon crossover. The system was only available in combination with the V8 and automatic transmission. Holden chose not to spend extra engineering resources on adapting the AWD system to the 3.8-litre V6, due to be replaced in the upcoming VZ model. Unfortunately for Holden, the Adventra fell well short of expected sales, despite modest targets.

VZ (2004–2007) 

The final chapter of the third generation series was the VZ Commodore. Debuting in 2004 with a new series of V6 engines known as the Alloytec V6, both  and  versions of the 3.6-litre engine were offered. These were later upgraded to  respectively in the VE model. When compared to the previous Ecotec engines, the Alloytec benefits from increased power output, responsiveness and fuel efficiency. The new engines were mated to a new five-speed 5L40E automatic transmission on the luxury V6 variants, and a new six-speed Aisin AY6 manual transmission on the six-cylinder SV6 sports variant. However, the long serving four-speed automatic carried on in other variants, albeit with further tweaks in an attempt to address complaints about refinement. A new 6.0-litre Generation 4 V8 engine was added to the range in January 2006 to comply with Euro III emission standards. Compared to the American version, both Active Fuel Management and variable valve timing were removed.

Along with the new powertrain, Holden also introduced new safety features such as electronic stability control and brake assist. The Used Car Safety Ratings evaluation found that VT/VX Commodores provide a "better than average" level of occupant protection in the event of an accident, with VY/VZ models uprated to "significantly better than average". ANCAP crash test results rate the fourth generation VE lower in the offset frontal impact test than the third generation VY/VZ Commodore. The overall crash score was marginally higher than the outgoing model due to improved side impact protection.

Fourth generation (2006–2017)

VE (2006–2013) 

Launched in 2006 after GM's 2003 abandonment of their last European rear-drive sedan, the Opel Omega, the VE is the first Commodore model designed entirely in Australia, as opposed to being based on an adapted Opel-sourced platform. Given this and high public expectations of quality, the budget in developing the car reportedly exceeded . Underpinned by the new Holden developed GM Zeta platform, the VE features more sophisticated independent suspension all round and near-even 50:50 weight distribution, leading to improved handling. Engines and transmissions are largely carried over from the previous VZ model. However, a new six-speed GM 6L80-E automatic transmission was introduced for V8 variants, replacing the old four-speed automatic now relegated to base models. The design of this new model included innovative features to help minimise export costs, such as a symmetrical centre console that houses a flush-fitting hand brake lever to facilitate its conversion to left-hand drive. Internationally, the Commodore is again badge engineered as the Chevrolet Lumina and Chevrolet Omega, along with its new export market in the United States as the Pontiac G8 (discontinued as of 2010 along with the Pontiac brand).

Variants by Holden's performance arm, HSV, were released soon after the sedan's debut, followed by the long-wheelbase WM Statesman/Caprice models. The VE Ute did not enter production until 2007 whilst the Sportwagon began production in July 2008. A VE V8 Calais was awarded Wheels Car of the Year, being the fifth Commodore/Calais model to do so.

In late 2008 Holden made changes to the VE Commodore, including the addition of a passenger seatbelt-reminder system. The rollout of such modifications allowed the VE range to be upgraded in stages (dependent on model) to the five-star ANCAP safety rating during 2008 and 2009.

The September 2009 MY10 update to the VE Commodore platform introduces a new standard engine–a 3.0-litre Spark Ignition Direct Injection (SIDI) V6 on the Omega and Berlina, with a 3.6-litre version of the same reserved for all other V6 variants. The standard transmission is now a six-speed GM 6L50 automatic, replacing the four-speed in Omega and Berlina models and the five-speed in higher luxury levels. A six-speed manual is still available in sport models. The 3.0L produces , more than the earlier 3.6L and more than the old 5.0L Holden V8. The new 3.6 produces a fraction more at  although the difference is negligible in real world driving.

In mid-2010 Holden released the VE Series 2 (VEII). The major difference saw the introduction of the Holden iQ system, a centre-mounted LCD display that provides navigation, Bluetooth, and controls to the stereo. There were also small alterations to the styling and a number of other changes.

VF (2013–2017) 

The VF Commodore, a major overhaul of the VE, was officially revealed on 10 February 2013 in Melbourne.

The body shell, suspension and electrics of the GM Zeta platform have been thoroughly reworked to reduce weight, improving handling and fuel efficiency. Changes to the model line-up see the deletion of the Berlina nameplate (which was merged with the standard Calais variant, represented the smallest share of sales in Commodore's line-up) and the base model renamed from Omega to Evoke.

Standard features across the Commodore range includes front and rear parking sensors, reverse camera and auto park assist, whereas high specifications models such as the Calais-V and SS-V redline models also feature, as standard, forward and reverse collision alert system and a colour heads-up display - all possible thanks to the VF's electronics now being compatible with those of more developed GM cars, resulting in the new Commodore being cheaper to manufacture.

A day after the Australian range reveal and in the lead up to the Daytona 500 weekend, a more powerful and better equipped export version of the VF Commodore SS also made its debut in Daytona, Florida, as the MY14 Chevrolet SS. To maximise the SS's profile in the United States, GM also replaced in NASCAR the Chevrolet Impala with the SS, which raced in NASCAR's premier series through 2017, when it was replaced by the Chevrolet Camaro ZL1 for the 2018 season.

A Series II update (VF II) was launched in late 2015, introducing minor styling revisions at the front, while the biggest change was the arrival of a  LS3 across the entire V8 range. In addition, the  V8's final drive ratio and the Redline's suspension tune were also revised.

Fifth generation (2018–2020)

ZB (2018–2020) 

In 2017, Holden announced that the Commodore would end production in Australia and confirmed that the Commodore badge would be inherited by its replacement - now fully imported. This decision was made on the basis of a survey revealing that a majority of customers were in favour of retaining the long-standing Australian badge introduced in 1978.

In October 2016, Holden provided selected journalists an opportunity to test drive early prototypes of the 2018 Commodore.

The ZB Commodore was revealed on the 6 December 2016 as a rebadged version of the Opel Insignia B. The ZB Commodore was offered with four or six-cylinder engine options, as well as front-wheel drive (FWD) or all-wheel drive. This was a major departure from the V8 and rear wheel drive variants available on the previous generation Commodore. 

There has been significant controversy regarding Holden's decision to retain the Commodore name for the 2018 model, despite it being dimensionally smaller than its predecessor, lacking a V8 engine option and switching from a RWD to a FWD drivetrain. Whilst the decision has been considered to be a safe choice in order to preserve sales, the retention of the Commodore name has been critiqued for Holden missing the opportunity to rebrand its sedan range and push its offering into the more lucrative semi-premium end of the market.

, the ZB Commodore has the lowest resale value as a proportion of new price of any car on the Australian market.

Due to slow sales and Holden's interest in other vehicle segments, it was announced on 10 December 2019 that the ZB Commodore would be discontinued in early 2020, shortly before GM's decision to retire the Holden brand entirely.

Australian export models 
Since the late 1990s, Commodores have been sent abroad as the Chevrolet Lumina in the Middle East until 2011 and South Africa until 2013, and as the Chevrolet Omega in Brazil until 2008 and, then again, in 2010. Vauxhall VXR8 sales began in 2007. Versions have also been previously exported in the mid-1990s to Southeast Asia as the Opel Calais and to North America from 2008 to 2009 as the Pontiac G8. From 2014 to 2017, the VF Commodore was sold in the United States as the Chevrolet SS and the sport version from HSV sold in the United Kingdom as the Vauxhall VXR8.

Chevrolet Lumina 

The Commodore was sold as the Chevrolet Lumina in the Middle East and South Africa, and previously in South East Asia.

A coupe version based on the Holden Monaro was also sold in the Middle East as the Chevrolet Lumina Coupe. In Arabia, the Lumina was offered in four different trims: LS (Omega), LTZ (Berlina), S (SV6) and SS (SS). The LTZ and S came standard with a 3.6 L Alloytec V6 and a six-speed automatic transmission for the S and four-speed for the LTZ, while the SS came standard with a 6.0 L Alloytec V8 with the option of active fuel management. A six-speed manual was standard with the option of a six-speed automatic on the SS. The LTZ was the luxury model, while the S and SS models focused on sportiness. Exports to the Middle East ceased in 2011.

Lumina models sold in South Africa dropped the V6 engine in favour of 6.0 litre V8 engine mated to a six-speed manual or automatic. All cars were equipped with Brembo brake calipers and a ZF limited-slip differentials. The car received updates for the 2011 model year. These changes were introduced to coincide with the release of the VE Series II Commodore. Changes included revised bumpers, there is a chrome moulding above the number plate on the boot lid, refreshed alloy wheel designs and the Holden IQ system. Also the SSV model was introduced. The Holden Ute was sold as the Lumina Ute in South Africa and has the same equipment as the sedan.

Australian production 
Australian production of the first Commodore launched in 1978 was initially spread between Holden's Pagewood (New South Wales) and Dandenong (Victoria) plants. In August 1978, Holden announced a $6.7 million program to enable assembly of the Commodore range at the Elizabeth (South Australia) plant, which resulted in the closure of the Pagewood plant a year later. The Australian production of the Commodore was consolidated at Elizabeth in 1988, coinciding with the launch of the then new VN Commodore.

The Commodore and its derivatives have been the basis of modified variants by companies separate to Holden. Officially, Holden's performance partner is HSV, although other prominent high performance brands include HDT Special Vehicles, Corsa Specialized Vehicles (CSV) and Walkinshaw Performance (WP), since the first, third and fourth generation Commodore, respectively.

In December 2013, Holden announced that it would cease production of the Commodore in Australia in 2017. This was followed, in December 2015, by "Project Erich" involving Belgian entrepreneur Guido Dumarey. His plans involve buying the Holden production facilities, with a view to continue producing in Australia a rebadged range of RWD and AWD premium vehicles based on the GM Zeta platform, for local and export sales. Dumarey's company, Punch Powerglide, already supplies automatic transmissions for Holden's V6-powered models made in Australia. The last Commodore - the last Holden vehicle to be manufactured in Australia - rolled off the line at the Elizabeth plant on 20 October 2017.

Sales

References

Bibliography 
Books

 
 
 
 Part One, Part Two, Part Three (PDF).
 
 
 
 
 
 
 

Magazines

External links 

 
 Holden Model History – Holden Commodore
 Holden Commodore at Unique Cars and Parts
 3D view of Holden Commodore 1980
 The Unofficial Holden Commodore Archive
 Huge website around the Opels of the time including the Holden Commodore VB

 
Cars introduced in 1978
1970s cars
1980s cars
1990s cars
2000s cars
2010s cars
Cars of Australia
Full-size vehicles
Commodore
Mid-size cars
Rear-wheel-drive vehicles
Sedans
Station wagons